Pavel Cristian Balaj (born 17 August 1971 in Baia Mare, Maramureș County, Romania) is a Romanian former football player and retired referee.

On 18 January 2019, Balaj was elected Romanian Anti-Doping Agency President. Subsequently, on 4 November 2021, Balaj signed with Liga I 4 times champion club CFR Cluj as their new president, after the departure of Marian Copilu earlier in 2021.

Career
As a player, Balaj represented FC Baia Mare and Pécsi Mecsek FC. He became a referee in 1994, entered Romania's Liga I in 2000, and earned FIFA certification in 2003.

At international level, Balaj has served as a referee in qualifying rounds for Euro 2008 and Euro 2012, as well as 2010 and 2014 World Cup qualifiers.

References

External links
 Profile
 worldreferee.com

1971 births
Living people
Sportspeople from Baia Mare
CS Minaur Baia Mare (football) players
Romanian football referees
Association football midfielders
Romanian footballers